Dmitri Lvovich Popov (born 27 February 1967) is a Russian football official and a former player who played as a left midfielder.

Football career
Popov was born in Yaroslavl, Soviet Union. He started playing professionally at local FC Shinnik Yaroslavl, then signed with country giants FC Spartak Moscow.

In 1993, Popov moved to Spain alongside teammate Dmitri Radchenko, and would spend there the following six-and-a-half years, with Racing de Santander (in the 1995–96 season, he teamed up there with compatriot Ilshat Faizulin), SD Compostela and CD Toledo. In January 2000 he joined Israel's Maccabi Tel Aviv FC, retiring at the end of the campaign.

Popov returned to Spartak Moscow in 2008, as its director of football. He obtained 21 caps and scored four goals for the Russian national team, and was part of the national squad at the 1994 FIFA World Cup. In 2009, he played in the national senior XI that won the Legends Cup.

Honours
Soviet Top League: 1989
Soviet Cup: 1992
Russian Premier League: 1992, 1993

References

External links
RussiaTeam biography and profile 

1967 births
Living people
Footballers from Yaroslavl
Soviet footballers
Russian footballers
Association football midfielders
Soviet Top League players
Russian Premier League players
FC Shinnik Yaroslavl players
FC Spartak Moscow players
La Liga players
Segunda División players
Racing de Santander players
SD Compostela footballers
CD Toledo players
Israeli Premier League players
Maccabi Tel Aviv F.C. players
Russia international footballers
1994 FIFA World Cup players
Russian expatriate footballers
Expatriate footballers in Spain
Expatriate footballers in Israel
Russian expatriate sportspeople in Spain
Russian expatriate sportspeople in Israel